Back Stage is a 1923 silent Our Gang silent short subject comedy film that is the 13th entry to be released.

Plot 
The gang meets up with the head of a vaudeville troupe, who enlist them to help him out when his co-stars have abandoned him. They manage to make a complete wreck of the act, and Jack and Joe's bugs get loose in the auditorium, putting the audience into an itching frenzy.

Notes 
This was the 13th and final film to be released in the original contract. Another contract was written and accepted bringing in more films, starting with Dogs of War.

Cast

The Gang 
 Joe Cobb as Joe
 Jackie Condon as Jackie
 Mickey Daniels as Mickey
 Jack Davis as Jack
 Allen "Farina" Hoskins as Farina
 Ernie "Sunshine Sammy" Morrison as Ernie
 Andy Samuel as Andy
 Dinah the Mule as Herself

Additional cast 
 Ivadell Carter as Pansy
 James W. Cobb as Audience member disrupted by Farina
 Richard Daniels as Audience member slapping spider
 William Gillespie as Head of the theater troupe
 Wallace Howe as Theater manager
 Dick Gilbert as Outside worker
 Charley Young as Outside worker
 Robert F. McGowan as Man in front of the bus

Sequence 
012. Giants vs. Yanks (1923) – proceeds
014. Dogs of War (1923) – succeeds

External links 
 
 
 

1923 films
Hal Roach Studios short films
American silent short films
American black-and-white films
1923 comedy films
Films directed by Robert F. McGowan
Our Gang films
1923 short films
Pathé films
1920s American films
Silent American comedy films
1920s English-language films